Jonas Lundén is a Swedish former footballer who last played for GAIS in Allsvenskan. He notably also played for IF Elfsborg and IFK Göteborg. Lundén played as a forward early in his career but at Elfsborg he was reschooled as a winger and full back. In 2001, he played one game for the Sweden national football team. He received a degree of fame amongst football computer game fans as one of the best prospects in SI Games' Championship Manager 2001/02 - one of a golden generation of Swedish youngsters who found fame outside of Sweden due to the cult football management game.

References

 
  
 

1980 births
Living people
IF Elfsborg players
IFK Göteborg players
IK Brage players
GAIS players
Swedish footballers
Sweden international footballers
Association football defenders
Association football forwards
People from Borlänge Municipality
Sportspeople from Dalarna County